Emmanuel Osei Kuffour (born 6 April 1976) also known as The General, is a Ghanaian former professional footballer who played as a midfielder.

Career
During his career, Accra-born Kuffour represented Ebusua Dwarfs, Accra Hearts of Oak SC, FC Anzhi Makhachkala, Tractor Sazi FC, Ashanti Gold SC, Asante Kotoko FC, Power F.C. and Al-Ittihad Club Tripoli, playing in four countries. Kuffour won the Ghana Premier League six times, the CAF Champions League, the CAF Confederation Cup and the CAF Super Cup.

He gained 31 caps for Ghana and was picked for the squad at both the 2000 and 2002 Africa Cup of Nations, also featuring in the 1996 Summer Olympics football tournament.

International goals
Scores and results list Ghana's goal tally first.

References

External links

1976 births
Living people
Footballers from Accra
Ghanaian footballers
Association football midfielders
Ebusua Dwarfs players
Accra Hearts of Oak S.C. players
Ashanti Gold SC players
Asante Kotoko S.C. players
Power F.C. players
Al Ain FC players
UAE Pro League players
Russian Premier League players
FC Anzhi Makhachkala players
Tractor S.C. players
Ghana international footballers
1998 African Cup of Nations players
2000 African Cup of Nations players
2002 African Cup of Nations players
Olympic footballers of Ghana
Footballers at the 1996 Summer Olympics
Ghanaian expatriate footballers
Expatriate footballers in Russia
Expatriate footballers in Iran
Expatriate footballers in Libya
Ghanaian expatriate sportspeople in Russia
Ghanaian expatriate sportspeople in Libya
Ghanaian expatriate sportspeople in Iran